Chamaesphegina argentifacies is a species of Hoverfly in the family Syrphidae.

Distribution
Argentina, Chile.

References

Eristalinae
Insects described in 1933
Diptera of South America
Taxa named by Raymond Corbett Shannon